MLS Innovation Inc. is a Greek software engineering and telecommunications equipment company founded in October 1989 in Thessaloniki.  In May 2001, it was officially listed on the Athens Stock Exchange. Its headquarters are in Thessaloniki, while the company keeps a commercial department in Athens.

MAIC (MLS Artificial Intelligence Center)
MAIC is the main selling point of MLS, which is now incorporated in all its devices.
MAIC has dramatically evolved the user experience of all MLS devices while interacting with the user. MAIC uses voice recognition technologies to perform the following actions (non exhaustive list):
 calls,
 messaging and email,
 search the Internet or YouTube,
 tracking, navigation and calls to open pharmacies, hospitals, banks, petrol stations,
 information on nearby parking, traffic on the road or weather report,
 launch installed applications,
 encyclopedic searches and dictation of their summary,
 translating words or sentences and spelling out the correct pronunciation from Greek to English and vice versa.

Products

Educational boards 
In 2010 MLS entered the educational technology market and completed the development of its own innovative interactive touch board, the MLS IQBoard, for use in all forms of classroom-based instructional technologies. MLS undertook the supply and installation of approximately 1,100 interactive boards,  totaling 1.6 mil. Euros.

Smartphones
In 2012 the company expanded its commercial activities in the mobile phone market by launching the first Greek Android smartphone MLS iQTalk.

MLS Diamond
At the end of 2015, MLS announced the creation of a new category of products with the brand name "Diamond", which included the premium smartphones models MLS Diamond 4G, MLS Diamond 5.2 4G and MLS Diamond Fingerprint 4G.

2-in-1 tablet & laptop
MLS Magic is MLS's latest innovative product, which was launched in 2016 and belongs to the 2-in-1 category of products, allowing the user to own both a tablet and a laptop.  It is also dual boot, meaning that it combines two operating systems, both Windows and Android.

Corporate bond
MLS announced on Tuesday 19 July 2016 the trade of a total 400 common registered titles, each worth 10,000 Euros, which would begin trading in the Fixed Income Alternative Market of the Athens Stock Exchange (ASE). The duration of the corporate bond is four (4) years with an option to extend for one (1) more year. At the end of every coupon period, which will be quarterly, the issuer will deposit the coupon amount to every holder of the Corporate Bond title(s), calculated based on an annual interest rate of 5.30%. (coupon rate).

European projects
Research & Development is the core of the company's activities and so MLS Innovation has been engaging in various partnerships and research programs while providing its expertise to third parties by developing and supporting applications in the fields of educational technology, linguistic technology, telematics and multimedia applications. A non exhaustive list of European projects where MLS has participated in is shown below:

 Inlife
 Movesmart
 Prosperity4All
 Choreos

Market share
At the end of 2015 MLS reached the top of tablet sales in Greece, with an impressive 17% market share.

Prizes and distinctions

 1998 European Information Technology Prize
 2008 Product of the Year (Τ3&PC Magazine) – MLS Destinator 4800 awarded Product of the Year 2008 Title
 2008 Business Innovation Award as part of the event "Money Business Awards 2008"
 2009 Product of the Year (Τ3&PC Magazine) – Voice recognition system MLS Destinator Talk&Drive™ awarded Product of the Year 2009 title
 2010 Product of the Year (Τ3&PC Magazine) –  Live recognition system with voice MLS Destinator Talk&Drive liveTRAFFIC awarded Product of the Year 2010 title
 2011 Product of the Year (Τ3&PC Magazine) – The navigation system with voice MLS Destinator Talk&Drive™ liveTRAFFIC 500 won Product of the Year 2011 title
 2013 - Greek Exports Awards - Technology-Innovation Award (Greek Exports Forum 2013)
 2013 Business Award in the category "Business Innovation Prize" (organization of business Money Awards)
 2014 - LIGHTHOUSE RETAIL BUSINESS AWARDS - Supplier of the Year 2014
 2014 Greek value - Innovation Award from the institution GREEK VALUE Federation of Industries of Northern Greece (SBBE)
 2014 Supplier of the Year - Industry and Retail Trade Retail Magazine Business Awards
 2015 Greek Branded Product Honors  - Industrial Products (Made in Greece Awards)
 2015 High Growth Business Award (organization Ethos events - Money business Awards)

References

Software companies of Greece
Computer hardware companies
Companies listed on the Athens Exchange
Mobile phone manufacturers
Companies based in Thessaloniki
Greek brands